The Worcester Blades were a professional women's ice hockey team in the Canadian Women's Hockey League, based in Worcester, Massachusetts, and played their home games at the Fidelity Bank Worcester Ice Center. The team began play in the 2010–11 CWHL season as the Boston Blades where they won the Clarkson Cup twice, in 2013 and 2015.

After playing in several Boston-area arenas throughout its first eight seasons, the Blades moved to Worcester in 2018 and rebranded.

In 2019, the CWHL ceased operations, as well as all teams that it directly owned including the Blades.

History

On August 12, 2010, the Canadian Women's Hockey League (CWHL) announced that Boston would be granted an expansion team for the 2010–11 CWHL season, making the Boston franchise the first CWHL team in the United States.

On September 14, 2010, retired goalkeeper Erin Whitten was named Boston's first head coach. An expansion draft was held to stock the team in August. Their most significant player was free agent signing Angela Ruggiero, a four-time Olympian.

The Boston Blades' inaugural season included 16 home games. Their first match, on October 30, 2010, ended with a 3–0 shutout victory over the Burlington Barracudas, with the team beginning the season with seven victories in their first twelve games.  A seven-game losing streak ensued, and the Blades finished with a 10–16 record, still good enough for third place in the five team league. In the playoffs against the Toronto Aeros, the Blades lost 4–2 and 3–1, swept in the best-of-three series.

In the 2012–13 season, the Boston Blades were regular season champions and then became the second American-based team to capture the Clarkson Cup, which was the women's equivalent of the men's Stanley Cup, after the Minnesota Whitecaps. The Clarkson Cup is named after Canada's former Governor General, Adrienne Clarkson, and used to be played for between all Canadian women's leagues. The Blades beat the rival Montreal Stars for the clinching victory. Hilary Knight was named CWHL MVP, Geneviève Lacasse Best Goalie, and Digit Murphy Coach of the Year.

In the penultimate game of the regular season in 2013–14, Jessica Koizumi became the first player to register 50 career points with the Blades franchise.

In the 2014–15 season, the Blades finished the regular season with the best record in the CWHL at 15–2–1–6. During the season, the league held its 1st Canadian Women's Hockey League All-Star Game, with Digit Murphy serving as the winning coach for Team Red. In the first round of the Clarkson Cup playoffs, the Blades were matched against the fourth seeded Toronto Furies. The best-of-three series ended in a sweep for the Blades with 3–0 and 7–3 victories.

On March 7, 2015, the Boston Blades faced the Montreal Stars for the Clarkson Cup, their second appearance in the Clarkson Cup finals in three years. Both the Blades and Stars tallied goals in the first and third periods. Hillary Knight and Brianna Decker were the lone goal scorers in regulation for the Blades. Regulation ended with the score tied at 2–2, requiring an overtime period to decide a winner. Janine Weber scored the series-clinching goal on a pass from her former college roommate Corinne Buie, 2:12 in the overtime period earning the Blades their second Clarkson Cup.

Following the 2015 season, the National Women's Hockey League was established, adding its own team in Boston, the Boston Pride. Soon after, all U.S. national team players on the Blades moved to the Pride, leaving the Blades to have to rebuild from the ground up.

The Blades competed with the Pride for Boston fans until 2018 when the team relocated an hour away to Worcester and were rebranded as the Worcester Blades on August 20, 2018, playing out of the Fidelity Bank Worcester Ice Center for the 2018–19 CWHL season.

Season-by-season records

Notable former players
  Kacey Bellamy
  Caitlin Cahow
  Meghan Duggan
  Molly Engstrom
  Kaleigh Fratkin
  Jaclyn Hawkins
  Hilary Knight
  Geneviève Lacasse
  Erika Lawler
  Gigi Marvin
  Molly Schaus
  Anne Schleper
  Kelli Stack
  Kelley Steadman
  Karen Thatcher
  Tara Watchorn

Scoring leaders

Season-by-season

All-time scoring leaders

Awards & honors
Hilary Knight, 2013 CWHL Player of the Year
Genevieve Lacasse, 2013 CWHL Goaltender of the Year
Jillian Dempsey, 2014 CWHL Rookie of the Year
Jillian Dempsey, 2013–14 Leading scorer among CWHL rookies
Brianna Decker, CWHL Rookie of the Year (2014–15)
Jillian Dempsey, 2014–15 Leading scorer among CWHL rookies
Tara Watchorn, CWHL Defender of the Year (2014–15)

Team honors
First overall, CWHL standings (2012–13)
First overall, CWHL standings (2014–15)

References

External links
 Official website

 
2010 establishments in Massachusetts
2019 disestablishments in Massachusetts
Canadian Women's Hockey League teams
Defunct ice hockey teams in the United States
Defunct sports teams in Massachusetts
Ice hockey teams in Worcester, Massachusetts
Ice hockey clubs established in 2010
Ice hockey clubs disestablished in 2019
Women's ice hockey teams in the United States